In the Tahitian story of Rata 'Aremata-Popoto ("tidal wave") and 'Aremata-Roroa ("long wave") are two ocean-dwelling monsters that Rata must overcome.

See also
Rātā (Māori mythology)
Laka for the Hawaiian equivalent

References

R.D. Craig, Dictionary of Polynesian Mythology (Greenwood Press: New York, 1989), 13-14; 
T. Henry, Ancient Tahiti (Bernice P. Bishop Museum: Honolulu, 1928), 470–495.

Tahiti and Society Islands mythology